Johannes-Friedrich Zimmermann (10 May 1882 – 24 August 1942 Sosva, Sverdlovsk Oblast, Russia) was an Estonian politician.

1929–1931 and 1932 he was Minister of Economic Affairs. In 1933 he was Minister of Agriculture.

References

1882 births
1942 deaths
People from Põltsamaa Parish
People from Kreis Fellin
Estonian Labour Party politicians
Settlers' Party politicians
Finance ministers of Estonia
Agriculture ministers of Estonia
Members of the Estonian Constituent Assembly
Members of the Riigikogu, 1920–1923
Members of the Riigikogu, 1923–1926
Members of the Riigikogu, 1926–1929
Members of the Riigikogu, 1929–1932
Members of the Riigikogu, 1932–1934
Hugo Treffner Gymnasium alumni
Estonian people executed by the Soviet Union